Szentandrás is the Hungarian name for two places in Romania:

 Sântandrei village, Simeria Town, Hunedoara County
 Sânandrei Commune, Timiș County